Altun Kupri is a town in Kirkuk Governorate, Iraq. Its inhabitants are predominantly Turkmen, with a minority of Arabs and Kurds. It is located on the shores of the Little Zab and on the Erbil–Kirkuk road. The town is described as having an 'intrinsic strategic significance' and is disputed.

Etymology 
Altun Kupri is the Anglicized version of the Iraqi Turkmen word for "altın köprü" in standard Turkish language, which is literally 'Golden Bridge' in English.

There are different theories for the town's name. Some believe that 'Golden Bridge' refers to a Turkish or Kurdish woman of that name, while others believe it refers to the colorful caravans that passed the town and its bridge on their way between Mosul and Baghdad.

History
Ottoman Sultan Murad IV built two bridges in the town which made it gain importance. It was visited by many European travellers and known for its scenery.

Altun Kupri had approximately 400 to 500 households by the end of the 18th century. Mirza Abu Taleb Khan visited the town in 1799, describing it as a big village with a mixed Kurdish and Turkmen population busy with farming. Moreover, it was a trading center between Kurdistan and Baghdad for figs, grapes and other agricultural products. Under the reign of Muhammad Pasha of Soran (1813-1836) he was able to extend his influence to this town and force the Ottoman governor of Baghdad to recognize his control. In 1906, the town had 4,000 inhabitants. The Ottomans destroyed the town's famous stone-built bridges in 1918 and replaced it with modern steel constructions.

In 1925, the town's population was predominantly Turkmen.

The town experienced Arabization during the Saddam era and an increased militarization to counter uprisings in the north from spreading towards Kirkuk.

More than a hundred Turkmen civilians were killed in the 1991 Altun Köpru massacre during the Gulf War by the Iraqi Army.

Demographics 
In the 1947 census Kurds constituted 70% of the population but decreased to 50% in 1957. In the census of 1965, the percentage of Kurds fell further to 25.7% but increased again to 75.6% in 1977. In the 2005 elections, the DPAK received 80% of the vote in the sub-district of Altun Kupri.

References

Populated places in Kirkuk Governorate
Turkmen communities in Iraq
Kurdish settlements in Iraq